Chain of Command is a 1994 Direct-To-Video American action film directed by David Worth. The film stars Michael Dudikoff, and co-stars R. Lee Ermey, Eli Danker, Eli Yatzpan and Joseph Shiloach.

It is the last film Michael Dudikoff made for The Cannon Group.

Plot
The film pairs a former Green Beret and a female Mossad agent.
Anti-terrorist operative Merrill Ross (Michael Dudikoff) gets caught in the middle of a deadly international conflict in this explosive adventure. Danger lurks around every corner as Ross tries to thwart a plot to seize control of Qumir and its oil fields. Tailed by agents and a death squad, Ross dodges bullets and barely survives an oil depot blast as he tries to find out who's behind the mercenary scheme.

Cast
 Michael Dudikoff
 Todd Curtis
 R. Lee Ermey
 Steve Greenstein
 Eli Danker
 Eli Yatzpan
 Joseph Shiloach
 Shai Schwartz

References

External links
 
 

1994 films
1994 action films
American action films
Films shot in Israel
Films directed by David Worth (cinematographer)
1990s English-language films
1990s American films